CRG Gallery was an art gallery on New York City's Lower East Side, located at 195 Chrystie St. CRG was founded in 1990 by Carla Chammas, Richard Desroche, and Glenn McMillan.

Originally CRG was located in a townhouse on the Upper East Side of Manhattan where they held the first New York solo shows for artists such as Jean-Marc Bustamante, Mona Hatoum and Jim Hodges. CRG then moved to South SoHo, Manhattan and in 2000 settled on 22nd street as its list of artists represented grew. The gallery moved to the Lower East Side in 2015. CRG hosted about six exhibitions a year. CRG closed in the summer of 2017.

References

External links
CRG Gallery website
CRG Gallery on ArtFacts.net
CRG Gallery on ChelseaGalleries.com
New York’s CRG Gallery to Close Its Doors After Twenty-Five Years

Contemporary art galleries in the United States
Art museums and galleries in Manhattan
American art dealers
Art galleries established in 1990
1990 establishments in New York City